Surge is a 2020 British thriller film, directed by Aneil Karia from a screenplay by Karia, Rupert Jones and Rita Kalnejasis. It stars Ben Whishaw, Ellie Haddington, Ian Gelder and Jasmine Jobson.

It had its world premiere at the Sundance Film Festival on 26 January 2020 and was released in the United Kingdom on 28 May 2021, by Vertigo Releasing.

Premise
A mentally-ill man goes on a bold and reckless journey of self-liberation in the city of London.

Cast
 Ben Whishaw as Joseph, Alan and Joyce’s son
 Ellie Haddington as Joyce, Joseph’s mother and Alan’s wife
 Ian Gelder as Alan, Joseph’s father and Joyce’s husband
 Jasmine Jobson as Lily
 Laurence Spellman as Scott
 Ryan McKen as Emre
 Muna Otaru as Adaeze
 Bradley Taylor as Patrick
 Ranjit Singh Shubh as Jonathon 
 Chris Coghill as Hamish (Best Man)
 Clare Joseph as Sarah (Bride)
 Perry Fitzpatrick as Bradley

Release
The film had its world premiere at the Sundance Film Festival on 26 January 2020. In January 2021, Vertigo Releasing acquired U.K. and Irish distribution rights to the film. It was released on 28 May 2021. In June 2021, FilmRise acquired U.S. distribution rights to the film. The film went on to gross $34,444 worldwide.

Critical reception
The site's critical consensus reads, "Discomfiting by design, Surge will wear some viewers down -- but Ben Whishaw's mesmerizing performance keeps the action gripping even when it's hard to take."
Whishaw received World Cinema Dramatic Special Jury Award for Acting at the Sundance Film Festival.

References

External links
 
 

2020 films
British thriller films
BBC Film films
2020s English-language films
2020s British films